A genetic chimerism or chimera is a single organism composed of cells with more than one distinct genotype. In animals and human chimeras, this means an individual derived from two or more zygotes, which can include possessing blood cells of different blood types, subtle variations in form (phenotype) and, if the zygotes were of differing sexes, then even the possession of both female and male sex organs. Animal chimeras are produced by the merger of two (or more) embryos. In plant chimeras, however, the distinct types of tissue may originate from the same zygote, and the difference is often due to mutation during ordinary cell division. Normally, genetic chimerism is not visible on casual inspection; however, it has been detected in the course of proving parentage. In contrast, an individual where each cell contains genetic material from two organisms of different breeds, varieties, species or genera is called a hybrid.

Another way that chimerism can occur in animals is by organ transplantation, giving one individual tissues that developed from a different genome. For example, transplantation of bone marrow often determines the recipient's ensuing blood type.

Etymology

While German dermatologist Alfred Blaschko described Blaschko's lines in 1901, the genetic science took until the 1930s to approach a vocabulary for the phenomenon. The term genetic chimera has been used at least since the 1944 article of Belgovskii.

Animals
An animal chimera is a single organism that is composed of two or more different populations of genetically distinct cells that originated from different zygotes involved in sexual reproduction. If the different cells have emerged from the same zygote, the organism is called a mosaic. Innate chimeras are formed from at least four parent cells (two fertilised eggs or early embryos fused together). Each population of cells keeps its own character and the resulting organism is a mixture of tissues. Cases of human chimeras have been documented.

This condition is either innate or it is synthetic, acquired for example through the infusion of allogeneic blood cells during transplantation or transfusion.

In nonidentical twins, innate chimerism occurs by means of blood-vessel anastomoses. The likelihood of offspring being a chimera is increased if it is created via in vitro fertilisation. Chimeras can often breed, but the fertility and type of offspring depends on which cell line gave rise to the ovaries or testes; varying degrees of intersex differences may result if one set of cells is genetically female and another genetically male.

Tetragametic chimerism

Tetragametic chimerism is a form of congenital chimerism. This condition occurs through the fertilization of two separate ova by two sperm, followed by aggregation of the two at the blastocyst or zygote stages. This results in the development of an organism with intermingled cell lines. Put another way, the chimera is formed from the merging of two nonidentical twins (a similar merging presumably occurs with identical twins, but as their genotypes are not significantly distinct, the resulting individual would not be considered a chimera). As such, they can be male, female, or have mixed intersex characteristics.

As the organism develops, it can come to possess organs that have different sets of chromosomes. For example, the chimera may have a liver composed of cells with one set of chromosomes and have a kidney composed of cells with a second set of chromosomes. This has occurred in humans, and at one time was thought to be extremely rare although more recent evidence suggests that this is not the case.

This is particularly true for the marmoset. Recent research shows most marmosets are chimeras, sharing DNA with their fraternal twins. 95% of marmoset fraternal twins trade blood through chorionic fusions, making them hematopoietic chimeras.

Most chimeras will go through life without realizing they are chimeras. The difference in phenotypes may be subtle (e.g., having a hitchhiker's thumb and a straight thumb, eyes of slightly different colors, differential hair growth on opposite sides of the body, etc.) or completely undetectable. Chimeras may also show, under a certain spectrum of UV light, distinctive marks on the back resembling that of arrow points pointing downwards from the shoulders down to the lower back; this is one expression of pigment unevenness called Blaschko's lines.

Another case was that of Karen Keegan, who was also suspected (initially) of not being her children's biological mother, after DNA tests on her adult sons for a kidney transplant she needed, seemed to show she was not their mother.

The tetragametic state has important implications for organ or stem cell transplantation. Chimeras typically have immunologic tolerance to both cell lines.

Microchimerism

Microchimerism is the presence of a small number of cells that are genetically distinct from those of the host individual. Most people are born with a few cells genetically identical to their mothers' and the proportion of these cells goes down in healthy individuals as they get older. People who retain higher numbers of cells genetically identical to their mother's have been observed to have higher rates of some autoimmune diseases, presumably because the immune system is responsible for destroying these cells and a common immune defect prevents it from doing so and also causes autoimmune problems.
The higher rates of autoimmune diseases due to the presence of maternally-derived cells is why in a 2010 study of a 40-year-old man with scleroderma-like disease (an autoimmune rheumatic disease), the female cells detected in his blood stream via FISH (fluorescence in situ hybridization) were thought to be maternally-derived. However, his form of microchimerism was found to be due to a vanished twin, and it is unknown whether microchimerism from a vanished twin might predispose individuals to autoimmune diseases as well. Mothers often also have a few cells genetically identical to those of their children, and some people also have some cells genetically identical to those of their siblings (maternal siblings only, since these cells are passed to them because their mother retained them).

Symbiotic chimerism in anglerfish

Chimerism occurs naturally in adult Ceratioid anglerfish and is in fact a natural and essential part of their life cycle. Once the male achieves adulthood, it begins its search for a female. Using strong olfactory (or smell) receptors, the male searches until it locates a female anglerfish. The male, less than an inch in length, bites into her skin and releases an enzyme that digests the skin of both his mouth and her body, fusing the pair down to the blood-vessel level. While this attachment has become necessary for the male's survival, it will eventually consume him, as both anglerfish fuse into a single hermaphroditic individual. Sometimes in this process, more than one male will attach to a single female as a symbiote. In this case, they will all be consumed into the body of the larger female angler. Once fused to a female, the males will reach sexual maturity, developing large testicles as their other organs atrophy. This process allows for sperm to be in constant supply when the female produces an egg, so that the chimeric fish is able to have a greater number of offspring.

Germline chimerism
Germline chimerism occurs when the germ cells (for example, sperm and egg cells) of an organism are not genetically identical to its own. It has been recently discovered that marmosets can carry the reproductive cells of their (fraternal) twin siblings due to placental fusion during development. (Marmosets almost always give birth to fraternal twins.)

Artificial chimerism 

An example of artificial chimerism in animals are the quail-chick chimeras. By utilizing  transplantation and ablation in the chick embryo stage, the neural tube and the neural crest cells of the chick were ablated, and replaced with the same parts from a quail. Once hatched, the quail feathers were visibly apparent around the wing area, whereas the rest of the chick's body was made of its own chicken cells.

Humans

A major mechanisms of human chimerism is mosaicism, wherein there is a mutation of the genetic material in a cell, giving rise to a subset of cells that are different from the rest. Another mechanism is the fusion of more than one fertilized zygote in the early stages of prenatal development.

In artificial chimerism, an individual has one cell lineage that was inherited genetically at the time of the formation of the human embryo and the other that was introduced through a procedure, including organ transplantation or blood transfusion. Specific types of transplants that could induce this condition include bone marrow transplants and organ transplants, as the recipient's body essentially works to permanently incorporate the new blood stem cells into it.

In contrast, a human where each cell contains genetic material from two organisms of different breeds, varieties, species or genera is called a human–animal hybrid.

Research

The first known primate chimeras are the rhesus monkey twins, Roku and Hex, each having six genomes. They were created by mixing cells from totipotent four-cell morulas; although the cells never fused, they worked together to form organs. It was discovered that one of these primates, Roku, was a sexual chimera; as four percent of Roku's blood cells contained two x chromosomes.

A major milestone in chimera experimentation occurred in 1984 when a chimeric sheep–goat was produced by combining embryos from a goat and a sheep, and survived to adulthood.

In August 2003, researchers at the Shanghai Second Medical University in China reported that they had successfully fused human skin cells and rabbit ova to create the first human chimeric embryos. The embryos were allowed to develop for several days in a laboratory setting, and then destroyed to harvest the resulting stem cells. In 2007, scientists at the University of Nevada School of Medicine created a sheep whose blood contained 15% human cells and 85% sheep cells.

On January 22, 2019 the National Society of Genetic Counselors released an article — Chimerism Explained: How One Person Can Unknowingly Have Two Sets of DNA, where they state “Tetragametic Chimerism, where a twin pregnancy evolves into one child, is currently believed to be one of the rarer forms.  However, we know that 20 to 30% of singleton pregnancies were originally a twin or a multiple pregnancy.  Due to this statistic, it is quite possible that tetragametic chimerism is more common than current data implies”.

Sponges 
Chimerism has been found in some species of marine sponges. Four distinct genotypes have been found in a single individual, and there is potential for even greater genetic heterogeneity. Each genotype functions independently in terms of reproduction, but the different intra-organism genotypes behave as a single large individual in terms of ecological responses like growth.

Mice

Chimeric mice are important animals in biological research, as they allow for the investigation of a variety of biological questions in an animal that has two distinct genetic pools within it. These include insights into problems such as the tissue specific requirements of a gene, cell lineage, and cell potential.

The general methods for creating chimeric mice can be summarized either by injection or aggregation of embryonic cells from different origins. The first chimeric mouse was made by Beatrice Mintz in the 1960s through the aggregation of eight-cell-stage embryos. Injection on the other hand was pioneered by Richard Gardner and Ralph Brinster who injected cells into blastocysts to create chimeric mice with germ lines fully derived from injected embryonic stem cells (ES cells). Chimeras can be derived from mouse embryos that have not yet implanted in the uterus as well as from implanted embryos. ES cells from the inner cell mass of an implanted blastocyst can contribute to all cell lineages of a mouse including the germ line. ES cells are a useful tool in chimeras because genes can be mutated in them through the use of homologous recombination, thus allowing gene targeting. Since this discovery occurred in 1988, ES cells have become a key tool in the generation of specific chimeric mice.

Underlying biology
The ability to make mouse chimeras comes from an understanding of early mouse development. Between the stages of fertilization of the egg and the implantation of a blastocyst into the uterus, different parts of the mouse embryo retain the ability to give rise to a variety of cell lineages. Once the embryo has reached the blastocyst stage, it is composed of several parts, mainly the trophectoderm, the inner cell mass, and the primitive endoderm. Each of these parts of the blastocyst gives rise to different parts of the embryo; the inner cell mass gives rise to the embryo proper, while the trophectoderm and primitive endoderm give rise to extra embryonic structures that support growth of the embryo. Two- to eight-cell-stage embryos are competent for making chimeras, since at these stages of development, the cells in the embryos are not yet committed to give rise to any particular cell lineage, and could give rise to the inner cell mass or the trophectoderm. In the case where two diploid eight-cell-stage embryos are used to make a chimera, chimerism can be later found in the epiblast, primitive endoderm, and trophectoderm of the mouse blastocyst.

It is possible to dissect the embryo at other stages so as to accordingly give rise to one lineage of cells from an embryo selectively and not the other. For example, subsets of blastomeres can be used to give rise to chimera with specified cell lineage from one embryo. The Inner Cell Mass of a diploid blastocyst, for example, can be used to make a chimera with another blastocyst of eight-cell diploid embryo; the cells taken from the inner cell mass will give rise to the primitive endoderm and to the epiblast in the chimera mouse.
From this knowledge, ES cell contributions to chimeras have been developed. ES cells can be used in combination with eight-cell-and two-cell-stage embryos to make chimeras and exclusively give rise to the embryo proper. Embryos that are to be used in chimeras can be further genetically altered in order to specifically contribute to only one part of chimera. An example is the chimera built off of ES cells and tetraploid embryos, which are artificially made by electrofusion of two two-cell diploid embryos. The tetraploid embryo will exclusively give rise to the trophectoderm and primitive endoderm in the chimera.

Methods of production
There are a variety of combinations that can give rise to a successful chimera mouse and according to the goal of the experiment an appropriate cell and embryo combination can be picked; they are generally but not limited to diploid embryo and ES cells, diploid embryo and diploid embryo, ES cell and tetraploid embryo, diploid embryo and tetraploid embryo, ES cells and ES cells. The combination of embryonic stem cell and diploid embryo is a common technique used for the making of chimeric mice, since gene targeting can be done in the embryonic stem cell. These kinds of chimeras can be made through either aggregation of stem cells and the diploid embryo or injection of the stem cells into the diploid embryo. If embryonic stem cells are to be used for gene targeting to make a chimera, the following procedure is common: a construct for homologous recombination for the gene targeted will be introduced into cultured mouse embryonic stem cells from the donor mouse, by way of electroporation; cells positive for the recombination event will have antibiotic resistance, provided by the insertion cassette used in the gene targeting; and be able to be positively selected for. ES cells with the correct targeted gene are then injected into a diploid host mouse blastocyst. Then, these injected blastocysts are implanted into a pseudo pregnant female surrogate mouse, which will bring the embryos to term and give birth to a mouse whose germline is derived from the donor mouse's ES cells. This same procedure can be achieved through aggregation of ES cells and diploid embryos, diploid embryos are cultured in aggregation plates in wells where single embryos can fit, to these wells ES cells are added the aggregates are cultured until a single embryo is formed and has progressed to the blastocyst stage, and can then be transferred to the surrogate mouse.

Plants

Structure
The distinction between sectorial, mericlinal and periclinal plant chimeras are widely used.

Graft chimeras

These are produced by grafting genetically different parents, different cultivars or different species (which may belong to different genera). The tissues may be partially fused together following grafting to form a single growing organism that preserves both types of tissue in a single shoot. Just as the constituent species are likely to differ in a wide range of features, so the behavior of their periclinal chimeras is like to be highly variable. The first such known chimera was probably the Bizzaria, which is a fusion of the Florentine citron and the sour orange. Well-known examples of a graft-chimera are Laburnocytisus 'Adamii', caused by a fusion of a Laburnum and a broom, and "Family" trees, where multiple varieties of apple or pear are grafted onto the same tree. Many fruit trees are cultivated by grafting the body of a sapling onto a rootstock.

Chromosomal chimeras

These are chimeras in which the layers differ in their chromosome constitution. Occasionally, chimeras arise from loss or gain of individual chromosomes or chromosome fragments owing to misdivision. More commonly cytochimeras have simple multiple of the normal chromosome complement in the changed layer. There are various effects on cell size and growth characteristics.

Nuclear gene-differential chimeras

These chimeras arise by spontaneous or induced mutation of a nuclear gene to a dominant or recessive allele. As a rule, one character is affected at a time in the leaf, flower, fruit, or other parts.

Plastid gene-differential chimeras

These chimeras arise by spontaneous or induced mutation of a plastid gene, followed by the sorting-out of two kinds of plastid during vegetative growth. Alternatively, after selfing or nucleic acid thermodynamics, plastids may sort-out from a mixed egg or mixed zygote respectively. This type of chimera is recognized at the time of origin by the sorting-out pattern in the leaves. After sorting-out is complete, periclinal chimeras are distinguished from similar looking nuclear gene-differential chimeras by their non-mendelian inheritance. The majority of variegated-leaf chimeras are of this kind.

All plastid gene- and some nuclear gene-differential chimeras affect the color of the plasmids within the leaves, and these are grouped together as chlorophyll chimeras, or preferably as variegated leaf chimeras. For most variegation, the mutation involved is the loss of the chloroplasts in the mutated tissue, so that part of the plant tissue has no green pigment and no photosynthetic ability. This mutated tissue is unable to survive on its own, but it is kept alive by its partnership with normal photosynthetic tissue. Sometimes chimeras are also found with layers differing in respect of both their nuclear and their plastid genes.

Origins
There are multiple reasons to explain the occurrence of plant chimera during plant recovery stage:

(1) The process of shoot organogenesis starts form the multicellular origin.

(2) The endogenous tolerance leads to the ineffectiveness of the weak selective agents.

(3) A self-protection mechanism (cross protection). Transformed cells serve as guards to protect the untransformed ones.

(4) The observable characteristic of transgenic cells may be a transient expression of the marker gene. Or it may due to the presence of agrobacterium cells.

Detection
Untransformed cells should be easy to detect and remove to avoid chimeras. This is because it is important to maintain the stable ability of the transgenic plants across different generations. Reporter genes such as GUS and Green Fluorescent Protein (GFP) are utilized in combination with plant selective markers (herbicide, antibody etc.) However, GUS expression depends on the plant development stage and GFP may be influenced by the green tissue autofluorescence. Quantitative PCR could be an alternative method for chimera detection.

Viruses

In 2012, the first example of a naturally-occurring RNA-DNA hybrid virus was unexpectedly discovered during a metagenomic study of the acidic extreme environment of Boiling Springs Lake that is in Lassen Volcanic National Park, California. The virus was named BSL-RDHV (Boiling Spring Lake RNA DNA Hybrid Virus). Its genome is related  to a DNA circovirus, which usually infect birds and pigs, and a RNA tombusvirus, which infect plants. The study surprised scientists, because DNA and RNA viruses vary and the way the chimera came together was not understood.

Other viral chimeras have also been found, and the group is known as the CHIV viruses ("chimeric viruses").

Ethics and legislation

Ethics
The US and Western Europe have strict codes of ethics and regulations in place that expressly forbid certain subsets of experimentation using human cells, though there is a vast difference in the regulatory framework. Through the creation of human chimeras comes the question: where does society now draw the line of humanity? This question poses serious legal and moral issues, along with creating controversy. Chimpanzees, for example, are not offered any legal standing, and are put down if they pose a threat to humans. If a chimpanzee is genetically altered to be more similar to a human, it may blur the ethical line between animal and human. Legal debate would be the next step in the process to determine whether certain chimeras should be granted legal rights. Along with issues regarding the rights of chimeras, individuals have expressed concern about whether or not creating human chimeras diminishes the "dignity" of being human.

See also
 Human chimera
 46,XX/46,XY
 Chimera (molecular biology)
 Conjoined twins
 Genetic chimerism in fiction
 Half-sider budgerigar
 Retron
 Vanishing twin
 X-inactivation (lyonization)

References

Further reading
 
 Appel, Jacob M. "The Monster's Law", Genewatch, Volume 19, Number 2, March–April 2007.
 Nelson, J. Lee (Scientific American, February 2008). Your Cells Are My Cells
 Weiss, Rick (August 14, 2003). Cloning yields human-rabbit hybrid embryo . The Washington Post.
 Weiss, Rick (February 13, 2005). U.S. Denies Patent for a too-human hybrid. The Washington Post.

External links

 "Chimerism Explained"
 Chimerism and cellular mosaicism, Genetic Home Reference, U.S. National Library of Medicine, National Institute of Health.
 Chimera: Apical Origin, Ontogeny and Consideration in Propagation
 Plant Chimeras in Tissue Culture
 Ainsworth, Claire (November 15, 2003). "The Stranger Within". New Scientist  . (Reprinted here )
 Embryogenesis of chimeras, twins and anterior midline asymmetries
 Natural human chimeras: A review

Reproduction
Intersex and medicine
Genetic anomalies
Twin